Francesco Salvi (born 7 February 1953) is an Italian actor, writer, comedian, singer and architect.

Biography 
Born in the northern town of Luino, near the Italian border with Switzerland, Salvi started his career in the mid-1980s. His performances over the years have included but are not limited to: cabaret, cinema, animated cinema, music, writing, theatre and television, with varying degrees of success.

During 1985–1987, Francesco Salvi was one of the main characters of the satirical TV variety show Drive In.

From 1988 to 1989, Salvi hosted his own television program, MegaSalviShow;. The title song of the show, C'è da spostare una macchina (Gotta Move a Car), of which Salvi was author and singer, gained a great commercial success, topping the Italian hit parade. In 1989 he also made his directorial debut with the film Vogliamoci troppo bene (Let's love too much) and took part in the Sanremo Music Festival with the song Esatto (Correct), which obtained critical and commercial success. He later took part to three more editions of the Festival between 1990 and 1996.

In 1991, he took part to the musical L'Odissea, a satirical music show inspired from Homer's Odyssey, aired by Canale 5 and directed by Beppe Recchia. Salvi interpreted Telemachus and Polyphemus, while Andrea Roncato played Ulysses and pornographic actress Moana Pozzi played Penelope. The same year Salvi starred in another satirical musical show, inspired by Alexandre Dumas's The Three Musketeers: I Tre Moschettieri, in which he played Athos.

On 1 March 1992, Francesco Salvi appeared in comics in the comic magazine Topolino, issue 1982, in the comic strip Pippo e l'ospite d'onore ("Goofy and the guest star"), which Salvi co-authored.  In the same year, he hosted the Italia 1 television show La strana coppia ("The Odd Couple"), together with fellow Italian comedian Massimo Boldi.

During 1995 and 1996, Salvi worked with Disney for the radio program Radiotopogiro, aired by Rai Radio 2. He also took part in Antonio Ricci's satirical television show Striscia la notizia, both as host and as fake cultural correspondent.

In 1997, he voiced the title-character in the Rai animation series Lupo Alberto.

In 2001 Salvi played his first dramatic role in the film The Comeback, and was nominated for Silver Ribbon for best actor. From 2004 he started working in the successful television series Un medico in famiglia, in which he starred for three seasons.

In 2006, Francesco Salvi co-hosted the third edition of the reality show La Fattoria (Italian version of The Farm), set in Morocco. In the same year he starred in the television shows Suonare Stella and Comedy Club (where he taught comedy to Italian singer Syria) and had a significant role in the crime film 10th & Wolf.

In 2008, Salvi was the recipient of the "Penisola Sorrentina Arturo Esposito" Best Male Character Award.

Francesco Salvi is the most cited author in Gino Vignali and Michele Mozzati's comedy quotes anthology Anche le formiche nel loro piccolo si incazzano ("Ants also, for their humble part, lose patience").

See also 
 List of Italian comedians

References

External links 

  (in Italian)
 

Living people
1953 births
People from the Province of Varese
Italian male television actors
Italian male film actors
Italian male stage actors
Italian comedy musicians
Italian television presenters